Alexxis Lemire (born May 30, 1996) is an American actress and model. She is known for her roles as Jesse Havnell in the 2017 Syfy horror television film Truth or Dare, as Kate Miller in the 2018 Lifetime thriller television film The Art of Murder, and as Aster Flores in the 2020 Netflix original movie The Half of It.

Early life and career 
Lemire was born in Londonderry, New Hampshire to a Puerto Rican mother and a French father. Of her heritage, Lemire has said "Sometimes people put the pressure on to choose what side I am. Being in this industry and going to castings, sometimes I'm too Latin for a Caucasian role, or not Latin enough. That's a struggle I continue to face." Lemire has one half-brother.

After graduating from Londonderry High School in 2014 where she participated in the school's cheer team, Lemire moved with her mother to Los Angeles to pursue her acting career, saying of the decision, “I felt like acting was the only way I was able to express myself. I could step into these other roles and understand a little more about empathy.” Aside from her acting career, Lemire is also a professional model.

In 2017, Lemire starred in Truth or Dare, a Syfy channel horror movie. In 2018, Lemire was cast in Netflix's The Half of It, an LGBT coming-of-age comedy-drama film written and directed by Alice Wu, which was released in May 2020.

Filmography

References

External links
 
 

Living people
21st-century American actresses
American models
1996 births
Hispanic and Latino American actresses
People from Londonderry, New Hampshire